The Third Vote (German: Drittstimme) is an election method proposed within the mathematical theory of democracy by Andranik Tangian. It is aimed at emphasizing issues of policy over personality The Third Vote has to-date only been used experimentally in student elections.

Description

The aim of the Third Vote method is to draw the voters' attention from personalities of politicians to policy issues, that is, from the question "Who should be elected?" to "What do we choose?". Therefore, the electors do not cast votes by candidate name, but give Yes/No-answers to several policy questions as raised in the candidates' manifestos. The same procedure is inherent in  voting advice applications (VAA) but the results are evaluated in a different way. In contrast to VAAs, answering the questionnaire implies no voting recommendation for the individual user. Instead, the answers of all voters are processed, and the political profile of the entire electorate is built with the balance of public opinion of pros/cons percentages for each issue. The election winner is the candidate whose policy profile (constituted by his/her Yes/No-answers to the same questions) best matches with that of the electorate.

If the candidates are political parties competing for parliament seats, the proximity of the party profiles to the electorate profile is indexed, and the parliament seats are allocated proportionally to the party indices. When considering decision options instead of candidates (whan a commission has to agree on a certain business plan, technical proposal, etc.), the questions focus on their specific characteristics.

Since the electorate is considered a single body with a single policy profile, no multiple-voter paradox like that of Borda, Condorcet or Arrow can arise.

History

The Third Vote method was developed in the 2010s at the Hans Böckler Foundation and the Karlsruhe Institute of Technology as part of the mathematical theory of democracy 
in order to improve policy representation and surmount the voters' irrationality. 
Although this voting method is completely self-sufficient, it was first tested as a complement to the two-vote system. The name "Third Vote" emphasizes the complementarity to the two-vote system of  mixed-member proportional representation, which is used in Germany, New Zealand, Bolivia, Lesotho, Thailand, South Africa, South Korea, United Kingdom (Scotland, Wales, and the London assembly) and Ethiopia.

The Third Vote was implemented during the annual student parliament elections (StuPa elections) 2016–2019 at the Karlsruhe Institute of Technology. The experiments were monitored on the Third Vote website
and the results were discussed in the German media 
as well as at the 2016 and 2019 World Forums for Democracy.

Example

Table 1 shows five dichotomous questions (assuming Yes/No answers) and the answers from three parties - Conservatives, Socialists and Greens - and from three equal groups of voters - A, B and C. (Questions 1 to 5 are the Questions 1, 2, 7, 28 and 32 from the 2017 German VAA Wahl-O-Mat, and the answers to these questions are that of the German conservative party CDU/CSU, the Social Democrats SPD and the greens GRÜNE.

Table 1 contains the party representation index "Popularity", which is the average size of the group represented. For example, the Conservatives answer Questions 1 to 4 as 1/3 of all voters and Question 5 as all voters (3/3). That leads to
 
The popularity of the Socialists and Greens is calculated in the same way, giving 60% and 53%, respectively. The election winners are therefore the Socialists.

The parliamentary seats are allocated in proportion to the parties’ indices of Popularity:  

The Third Vote is also applicable in the context of collective multiple-criteria decision making.

Implementation

Formulation of the questions. The questions are proposed by the candidates themselves - as part of the election campaign. After that, each candidate answers all questions, including the questions from other candidates. Thereby, complete policy profiles of all candidates are defined.

Final selection of questions. The final selection of a reasonable number of questions for the ballot, which best emphasize the contrast between the candidates, is done either by a special commission, as in the case of VAAs, or by a computer program that analyzes the parties' answers.

Unequal importance of questions.  The voters can optionally assign question weights (e.g. from 0 - unimportant to 5 - very important). The sum of the voter weights for each question is then used to determine the "average" public opinion about the relative importance of each issue, which is then used in calculations.

Taking into account the candidates’ credibility. To account for voter confidence, the Third Vote is combined with traditional voting by candidate name. The final rating of the candidates is then based on the average of the candidate's Popularity index and the percentage of votes the candidate received.

Ballot. An exemplary ballot form, which is virtually filled in by a voter from Group A, is shown in Table 2.

The Third Vote versus plurality vote, Borda count and Condorcet count

In the above example, the Third Vote finds a single winner, whereas no single winner is found by the plurality vote (the electors cast votes for the favorite candidate) and the Condorcet and Borda counts, which use the electors' preference orders shown 
in Table 3. In parentheses, the VAA-ratings are indicated, that is, the number of coincidences in the voter and party profiles. For example, Voter Group 1 coincides with the Socialists in 5 issues, with the Conservatives in 3 issues and the Greens in 2 issues. Therefore, Group 1's preference ordering is Socialists > Conservatives > Greens.

Table 4 shows that neither plurality vote nor the Borda count (sum of ranks) nor Condorcet count (pairwise vote) results in a single winner. 

Indeed, each voter group has its own favorite candidate, the sums of ranks (Borda count) are the same for all three candidates, and the pairwise vote (Condorcet count) leads to a Condorcet cycle without the weakest link to be cut:

References 

Voting theory
Electoral systems
Karlsruhe Institute of Technology